Xanthosia pilosa, known as the woolly xanthosia is a species of the plant family Apiaceae, but sometimes also placed in Araliaceae or Mackinlayaceae. It grows in south eastern Australia, in Tasmania, Victoria, New South Wales and Queensland. This species is known for the variability of form, which has caused difficulties in identification and taxonomy. The specific epithet pilosa comes from the Latin, meaning softly hairy.

A small shrub up to 65 cm tall, with stems less than 50 cm long. It grows in heathland or eucalyptus forests. Occasionally by streams, but often in rocky or sandy situations.

Leaves are woolly and lobed, and the whitish-green flowers form in spring and summer. The fruit is 2 to 3 mm long, with 7 to 9 ribs on the mericarp.
 
This plant was collected in Sydney, and first appeared in scientific literature in the year 1810 in the Transactions of the Linnean Society of London 10: 301, t. 22, fig. 1, authored by the English botanist, Edward Rudge.

Gallery

References

External links
Xanthosia pilosa Occurrence data from Australasian Virtual Herbarium

Mackinlayoideae
Apiales of Australia
Flora of New South Wales
Flora of Queensland
Flora of Tasmania
Flora of Victoria (Australia)